The 2017 Hungarian Grand Prix (formally the Formula 1 Pirelli Magyar Nagydíj 2017) was a Formula One motor race that took place on 30 July 2017 at the Hungaroring in Mogyoród, Hungary.

The race was won by Sebastian Vettel, ahead of Kimi Räikkönen and Valtteri Bottas.

Background 
Ferrari driver Sebastian Vettel entered the round leading the World Drivers' Championship by one point ahead of Mercedes's Lewis Hamilton. In the World Constructors' Championship, Mercedes led Ferrari by fifty-five points.

Williams's Felipe Massa was taken ill after Practice 3. Massa had been unwell and dizzy on Friday but was certified as fit to compete in Practice 3 by the medical staff. Massa did not feel any better during Practice 3, and his seat was taken by Williams reserve driver Paul di Resta for qualifying and the race.

Practice 
Red Bull's Daniel Ricciardo went fastest in first practice, setting a time of 1:18.486. He was followed by the Ferrari of Kimi Räikkönen and the Mercedes of Lewis Hamilton in second and third. In second practice, Ricciardo again set the fastest time followed by Vettel and Bottas. Saturday's third and final practice was topped by Vettel, with Räikkönen second and Bottas third. Vettel set the quickest time of all three practices with a 1:17.017.

Qualifying 
In the first segment of qualifying, Williams reserve driver di Resta made his first start since the 2013 Brazilian Grand Prix and quickly got up to speed with little prior practice. Di Resta's only experience in a hybrid F1 car consisted of 10 laps in a 2014-spec car and some laps in the simulator prior to the Australian Grand Prix. Di Resta qualified 19th in a car with Massa's settings, a performance that was described as "unbelievable" by Mercedes boss Toto Wolff. Di Resta later admitted that he was "scared, nervous, [and] anxious" about how he would perform given his lack of experience.

In the third segment of qualifying, Sebastian Vettel secured pole position with a time of 1:16.276. His teammate Kimi Räikkönen secured second place, thus giving Ferrari its first qualifying 1–2 in Hungary since 2004. Mercedes locked out the second row on the grid, Red Bull locked out the third row on the grid, and McLaren-Honda locked out the fourth row of the grid in its best qualifying performance of the season.

Qualifying classification 

Notes
 – Nico Hülkenberg received a five-place grid penalty for an unscheduled gearbox change.
 – Daniil Kvyat received a three-place grid penalty for impeding Lance Stroll during Q1.
 – Sergio Pérez and Kevin Magnussen set identical lap times in Q1. As Pérez was the first to set his time, he was considered to have qualified ahead of Magnussen.

Race 
At the start of the race, Vettel stayed ahead of his teammate, Räikkönen, and Bottas after Verstappen tried to go around the outside of Räikkönen and Bottas. Being forced off the track by Bottas, Verstappen went onto the curbs and was almost passed by his Red Bull teammate Daniel Ricciardo. Ricciardo and Verstappen collided at turn 2, after Verstappen's tyres locked up. This caused Ricciardo's radiator to break, forcing him to retire. Verstappen subsequently received a 10-second penalty for causing the incident. Ricciardo condemned Verstappen and called the incident "an amateur error". Verstappen later apologised for the incident.

The safety car was called out to clear Ricciardo's stricken Red Bull car and clean up oil from the track surface. The safety car went in at the end of lap 5, and shortly after the restart Vettel started to notice his steering pulling left on the straights. He was instructed to avoid the kerbs and his lap times slowed, allowing teammate Kimi Räikkönen and the two Mercedes to catch up. Romain Grosjean pitted and was released with a loose wheel-nut. His car had to be retired and Haas F1 Team was fined €5,000 for releasing Grosjean in unsafe conditions.

Räikkönen radioed to Ferrari that he wanted to get Vettel to move aside as Vettel was having problems and Räikkönen was putting in quicker lap times. Ferrari ordered Vettel to speed up and Räikkönen kept up with him, and they both gradually increased the gap to both Mercedes cars. Hamilton was allowed past teammate Bottas and given 10 laps to  try and get past Räikkönen, using a higher engine setting. Mercedes promised Bottas that if Hamilton could not get past, they would switch the cars back.

With nine laps to go, Nico Hülkenberg was forced off track by Kevin Magnussen and subsequently had to retire his car due to issues with the brakes and the gearbox. Magnussen was later given a five-second penalty for his actions, which were described as "nasty" by Hülkenberg. Hülkenberg condemned Magnussen and called him "the most unsporting driver on the grid". Magnussen responded with "suck my balls, mate" which received wide attention.

With Verstappen closing in, it appeared as if the switch back was not going to happen, but coming out of the last corner on the last lap, Hamilton slowed down, allowing Bottas past to claim the podium. Hamilton finished fourth, with Verstappen in fifth. McLaren-Honda got their first double-points finish of the season with Alonso finishing sixth and Vandoorne tenth. This result moved them out of last place in the Constructors' standings. Carlos Sainz Jr. finished seventh for Toro Rosso. Force India got a double-points finish with Pérez in eighth and Ocon in ninth. As a result of the race, Vettel extended his lead in the Drivers' Championship over Hamilton to 14 points. Mercedes's lead in the Constructors' Championship was reduced to 39 points over Ferrari.

Race classification

Notes
 – Kevin Magnussen had 5 seconds added to his race time for forcing Nico Hülkenberg off the track.
 – Nico Hülkenberg retired from the race, but was classified as he had completed 90% of the race distance.

Championship standings after the race 

Drivers' Championship standings

Constructors' Championship standings

 Note: Only the top five positions are included for both sets of standings.

See also 
 2017 Budapest Formula 2 round
 2017 Budapest GP3 Series round

References

External links

Hungarian
Grand Prix
Hungarian Grand Prix
Hungarian Grand Prix